Lygosoma singha is a species of skink that is endemic to the island of Sri Lanka.

Habitat and distribution
It is presumably a semi-fossorial skink endemic to Sri Lanka's north-east coast.

Ecology and diet
Lygosoma singha inhabits areas under 50 metres of elevation, and its diet may include insects.

References

Lygosoma
Reptiles of Sri Lanka
Endemic fauna of Sri Lanka
Reptiles described in 1950
Taxa named by Edward Harrison Taylor